Etrumeus sadina, the red-eye round herring, is a species of fish belonging to the family Dussumieriidae, a family notable for their rounded bellies.

Description 
The red-eye round herring has a very slim rounded body. Its anal and pelvic fins are small, and its scales are large and thin. Because of this, they often become dislodged when being caught. Its side and underside are silvery in color, and its back is a murky green.

Distribution and habitat 
Round herrings are found in the northwestern Atlantic Ocean, from the Bay of Fundy to Florida and the Gulf of Mexico. It can be found inshore during the summer in the northern sections of its occurring range, but in the southern half of its range, it is found farther from the shore at around 50 to 150 m depth.

References 

1.	Smith, L. C. The Inland Fishes of New York State. New York: The New York State Department of Environmental Conservation. 1985, pp. 396.
2.	Wheeler, A. Fishes of the World. New York: Macmillan Publishing Co., Inc. 1975, pp. 188

Clupeiformes
Fish of the Atlantic Ocean
Fish described in 1814